The Party for Bosnia and Herzegovina (abbreviated SBiH) is a Bosniak nationalist political party in Bosnia and Herzegovina. The party fervently opposes the continued power in hands of ethnic entities such as the Federation of Bosnia and Herzegovina and Republika Srpska.

List of presidents

Elections

Parliamentary elections

Presidency elections

References
Citations

Bibliography

Bosniak political parties in Bosnia and Herzegovina
Bosnian nationalism
Conservative parties in Bosnia and Herzegovina